Srednebelaya is a rural locality (a selo) and the administrative center of Srednebelovsky Selsoviet of Ivanovsky District, Amur Oblast, Russia. The population was 3,828 as of 2018. There are 31 streets. 

The former Sredne Belaya (air base) is located nearby.

Geography 
Srednebelaya is located 45 km north of Ivanovka (the district's administrative centre) by road. Polevoye is the nearest rural locality.

References 

Rural localities in Ivanovsky District, Amur Oblast